Christine Kajumba Magnusson (born 21 November 1964 in Toro Kingdom, Uganda) is a retired Swedish badminton player who won events in numerous Swedish National, open European and other international tournaments.

Career
Magnusson's Swedish national titles included seven in women's singles between 1982 and 1990. She won the bronze medal at the 1989 IBF World Championships and a silver medal at the 1991 IBF World Championships in women's doubles with Maria Bengtsson. She also represented Sweden at the 1992 Summer Olympics and 1996 Summer Olympics. She won gold in women's doubles at the 1992 and 1994 European Badminton Championships with Lim Xiaoqing and the Badminton World Cup women's doubles with Lim in 1993.

In the Open Grand Prix Circuit Christine Magnusson won the USSR International titles in singles and doubles (with Maria Bengtsson) in 1981, the Scottish Open singles titles in 1985, 1986 and 1988. In 1987 she won the Belgian International in women's singles and the Dutch Open doubles title with Maria Bengtsson. She won more women's doubles titles again with Maria Bengtsson at the Belgian International 1988 and also at the  Chinese Taipei Masters Open 1988 and the Finnish International 1990. In 1991 she won both the singles and doubles titles (with Maria Bengtsson) at the Chinese Taipei Masters Open.

She won the Scottish Open and German Open women's doubles titles in 1991 and 1992 with Lim Xiaoqing. She also won the doubles title at the Danish Open with Lim Xiaoqing in 1992 and 1994, the US Open in 1992, and both the Malaysia Open and Chinese Taipei Open in 1993.

In 1996 Christine Magnusson won the Polish Open doubles title with Marina Andrievskaia.

Achievements

World Cup 
Mixed doubles

IBF World Grand Prix
The World Badminton Grand Prix was sanctioned by the International Badminton Federation from 1983 to 2006.

Women's singles

Women's doubles

Mixed doubles

Personal life
Christine Magnusson was born in Uganda, as daughter of an Ugandan mother and a Swedish father. The family fled Uganda during the rule of Idi Amin and moved to Sweden in 1975 after also living in Kenya for a while, where she first came in contact with badminton. After arriving in Sweden she became a member of the Taby Badminton Club at the young age of ten years. Under the guidance of trainer Dan Andersson she quickly improved her skills and already at a young age of 16 years she was selected by the National badminton team of Sweden. Eventually playing two Olympic Games and many international events at the top level of the sport of badminton for many decades.

Christine was married to fellow Danish badminton player Max Gandrup and the pair have two children; daughter Tanja born in 1997 and son Kevin born in 1999. After retirement in the sport she started working as a sales coordinator at a cosmetics company. In her free time she now plays golf.

References

External links
 
 

1964 births
Living people
Badminton players at the 1992 Summer Olympics
Badminton players at the 1996 Summer Olympics
Olympic badminton players of Sweden
Swedish female badminton players
Ugandan emigrants to Sweden
Badminton players at the 1988 Summer Olympics